Martha Stevens is an American politician. She is a member of the Missouri House of Representatives from the 46th District. Her term began in 2017.

Stevens has a bachelor's degree in sociology and a Master's in social work from the University of Missouri.

References

Year of birth missing (living people)
Living people
21st-century American politicians
21st-century American women politicians
University of Missouri alumni
Democratic Party members of the Missouri House of Representatives
Place of birth missing (living people)
Women state legislators in Missouri